Eugen Samuilovich "Jenő" Varga (born as Eugen Weisz, November 6, 1879 in Budapest – October 7, 1964 in Moscow) was a Soviet economist of Hungarian origin.

Biography

Early years

He was born as Jenő Weiß (Hungarian orthography: Weisz) in a poor Jewish family, as a child of Samuel Weisz - who was a teacher in the primary school of Nagytétény - and Julianna Singer. Eugen "Jenő" Varga studied philosophy and economic geography at the University of Budapest. In 1906, he started writing in socialist and academic journals, mainly on economic subjects. Before World War I he gained some fame by discussing with Otto Bauer about the origins of inflation in the Austro-Hungarian Empire. In this period he belonged to the Marxist Centrists, of whom Karl Kautsky and Rudolf Hilferding were the most prominent spokesmen.

Hungarian revolution

In February 1919, Varga joined the newly created Hungarian Communist Party. During the short-lived Hungarian Soviet Republic of 1919, led by Béla Kun, he was People's Commissar for Finance, and then Chairman of the Supreme Council of National Economy. After the overthrow of the Soviet Republic he fled to Vienna.

Soviet emigration

In 1920 he went to the Soviet Union with Arthur Holitscher. Here he started working for the Comintern, specializing in international economic problems and agrarian questions. In years 1922-1927 he was working at the department of trade in the Soviet embassy in Berlin. In 1927-47, he was director of the Institute of World Economy and World Politics. In the 1930s he became an economic adviser to Joseph Stalin. He survived the purges of the 1930s, during which Bela Kun and other Hungarians were executed.

During World War II he advised the Soviet Government in matters of post-war reparations. He attended the Potsdam Conference of 1945 as an expert. Like most of his compatriots living and working in Moscow, he joined the Communist Party of the Soviet Union, but he also remained active in the Hungarian Communist Party.

He authored the economic reports the congresses of the Comintern discussed between 1921 and 1935. A large number of his writings were studies of the international economic conjuncture, in which he made great effort to assess quantitative trends in output, investment and employment using official economic data from numerous countries. He also extensively studied German imperialism.

Personality  
In 1922, Alexander Barmine, a Soviet diplomat who later defected to the west, travelled by train to Moscow with delegates to the Fourth Congress of Comintern, including Varga, who "showed the most revolting lack of consideration" by demanding a private railway compartment. Barmine considered that he should have content with a berth in a first class carriage. He wrote: "The little luxuries of power go to men's heads."

Another Soviet defector Abdurakhman Avtorkhanov, writing under the pseudonym Alexander Uralov, left a humorous description of Varga, whom he described as having "the pedantry of a German official, the obstinacy of a Russian accountant, and the suppleness of an Oriental fakir", and of his institute, where "share fluctuations were followed more attentively than in any London or New York bank. The most brilliant member of the Stock Exchange would have envied the way in which Varga was kept informed."

Post-War Controversy 
In 1946, Varga published The Economic Transformation of Capitalism at the End of the Second World War, in which he argued that during the war, western governments had accumulated great power over the management of capitalist economies, which brought them closer to socialist economies and more likely to last. He was praised by Kremlin watchers in the west as a 'person with a Western orientation' and a 'defender' of the Marshall Plan, but "these implications were highly distasteful to Soviet conservatives" who believed that capitalism was heading for an extreme and possibly terminal crisis. During a closed meeting of economists called by USSR Academy of Sciences and Moscow University, in May 1947, "Varga was attacked for his writings by most, if not all, of the participants."

He was also attacked by Nikolai Voznesensky, then a powerful figure as Chairman of Gosplan and a member of the Politburo, who wrote a book in which he accused 'certain theoreticians' of having 'empty opinions which deserve no consideration'. Varga's book was condemned at a meeting of economists and political experts in May 1947, and the institute he headed was closed and subsumed into Gosplan.  Though he remained a leading academic economist, his prestige had diminished - in the second edition of the Great Soviet Encyclopedia he was qualified as a "bourgeois economist" - but the fact that he was not dismissed or arrested implies that he had powerful protectors. In March 1949, Voznesensky was arrested, and two days later, on 15 March, Varga published a self-critical letter in Pravda.

Years after Stalin

After Stalin's death in 1953, he reappeared on the scene. In February 1956, he wrote the article in Pravda that rehabilitated Bela Kun. But the new men in power in the Kremlin believing in the virtues of peaceful co-existence were not interested in Varga's predictions of the outbreak of a "necessary" economic crisis in the United States. After his death, his selected works in three volumes were published in the Soviet Union, Hungary, and East Germany.

Varga never returned to living in his native Hungary. Because he was very close to Mátyás Rákosi, he was several times invited as an economic advisor to Hungary. In this period (1945-1950) he had specialized in economic planning, pricing and monetary reforms, i.e. reforms the Hungarian Communists now in power were carrying out. After the fall of Rákosi caused by the Hungarian Revolution of 1956 and the take-over by the Kádár team, Varga's advisory work was not appreciated anymore.

Awards 

 Three Orders of Lenin (1944, 1953, 1959)
 Order of the Red Banner of Labour (1945)
 Medal "For Valiant Labour in the Great Patriotic War 1941–1945" (1945)
 Lenin Prize (1963)

Footnotes

Further reading 
 Gerhard Duda, Jeno Varga und die Geschichte des Instituts für Weltwirtschaft und Weltpolitik in Moskau 1921-1970. Berlin, 1994.
 Charlene Gannage, "E. S. Varga and the Theory of State Monopoly Capitalism," Review of Radical Political Economics, vol. 12, no. 3 (Fall 1980), pp. 36–49.
 Peter Knirsch, Eugen Varga. Berlin, 1961.
 Laszlo Tikos, E. Vargas Tätigkeit als Wirtschaftsanalytiker und Publizist in der ungarischen Sozialdemokratie, in der Konimtern, in der Akademie der Wissenschaften der UdSSR. Tübingen, 1965.
 André Mommen, Eens komt de grote crisis van het kapitalisme. Leven en werk van Jeno Varga. Brussels, 2002.
 André Mommen, Stalin's Economist. The Economic Contributions of Jenö Varga. London: Routledge, 2011.

External links 
Eugen Varga on Marxist Internet Archive
Twentieth Century Capitalism by Varga, 1962.
Politico-Economic Problems of Capitalism by Varga, 1968.
 

1879 births
1964 deaths
20th-century Hungarian politicians
Politicians from Budapest
Budapest University alumni
Full Members of the USSR Academy of Sciences
Members of the German Academy of Sciences at Berlin
Members of the Vienna Psychoanalytic Society
Lenin Prize winners
Recipients of the Order of Lenin
Recipients of the Order of the Red Banner of Labour
Comintern people
Finance ministers of Hungary
Marxist theorists
Hungarian communists
Hungarian economists
Hungarian emigrants to the Soviet Union
Hungarian Jews
Hungarian revolutionaries
Jewish socialists
Russian socialists
Soviet economists
Burials at Novodevichy Cemetery